Compilation is a compilation cassette by New Zealand group The Clean. It was released in 1986 by Flying Nun Records. The album consists of early recordings, as well as songs from their 2 EPs, "Boodle Boodle Boodle" and "Great Sounds Great, Good Sounds Good, So-so Sounds So-so, Bad Sounds Bad, Rotten Sounds Rotten". The CD version also contains 6 additional live tracks.

Track listing

"Billy Two"
"At The Bottom"
"Tally Ho!"
"Anything Could Happen"
"Point That Thing Somewhere Else"
"Flowers"
"Fish"
"Beatnik"
"Getting Older"
"Slug Song"
"Oddity"
"Whatever I Do"

Bonus tracks on 1988 version

"Quickstep" - 4:11
"Count To Ten" - 2:03
"Wild Western Shores" - 2:41
"Art School" - 2:15
"Hold Onto The Rail" - 2:59
"Point That Thing Somewhere Else (A Return)" - 6:39

Personnel
 Vocals – Doug Hood
 Bass, Vocals – Peter Gutteridge
 Drums – Lyndsay Hooke
 Drums, Vocals, Artwork [Cover]– Hamish Kilgour
 Guitar, Liner Notes, Compiled By [Cd Booklet] – David Kilgour
 Compiled By [Cd Booklet], Photography By [All Other Photographs] – Craig McNab
 Photography By [Early Clean Photograph] – Terry Moore
 Recorded By – Chris Knox (tracks: 1, 4 to 10, 12), The Clean (tracks: 1, 2, 4 to 12), Doug Hood (tracks: 1, 4 to 10, 12)
 Written-By – Kilgour, Kilgour, Gutteridge (tracks: 5, 18), Scott (tracks: 1 to 4, 6 to 17)

References

The Clean albums
Flying Nun Records albums
Rough Trade Records albums
1986 compilation albums